Aytysh or Aytys is the name for the primarily folk oriented, oral tradition of improvised singing and oratory between two parties referred to in Kazakh as akyns but found throughout Central Asia. Each akyn, usually sitting close to each other, strums a folk instrument (Qomuz in Kyrgyz tradition and dombra in Kazakh tradition), and respond to each other in rhymed improvisational verses. 

The term is most commonly references a public song competition between aqyns. The practice of aytysh began primarily as a folk tradition before being adopted by akyns who later expanded the genre's form and themes to include national epics, heroic stories of national history, and patriotic narratives. According to researcher, the aytys is an embodiment of the mindset and worldview of the Kazakh nomads. Although rehearsed sections were part of the competition, those who could improvise and respond in witty, historically mindful, and inventive ways to their opponents won the most praise from the audience.

History 
The style may have originated from other styles like the Kazakh domestic song form called zhar-zhar[rus] or the Kazakh folksong style of badik[kk]. Only in the 19th century was the aytysh formally recorded in ethnographic study, stories such as Birzhan and Sary[rus] and Ulbike and Kuderi among the first stories to be documented.  

In 2001, the style of Aytysh was given formal protection in the form of the Aytysh Public Fund, and in 2015 the style was included in UNESCO's list of intangible world heritage.  

The style has been put onto the international stage since the late 2000s when competitions began to be held. The first modern competition was held in Bishkek in 2008, following the following year but held in Osh.

Themes 
Topics used in aytysh are various but primarily revolve around social, cultural, political, and personal matters. However, several themes have been identified by researchers:

 Badik - restorative folk song used to heal sickness
 Songs dedicated to living and deceased individuals
 Zhar-zhar - Songs dedicated to women in departure, primarily brides
 Dealings between boys and girls
 Conflict and argumentation
 Family business and internal politics
 Unknown or coded messaging
 Religious comments and topics
 Scripture texts
 Contemporary events

Extra links 

 КТРК 2014 (150th anniversary of T. Satylganov)

References

Kazakhstani music
Kyrgyz music